Arnold Jonke (born 25 December 1962 in Gmünd) is an Austrian rower.

References 
 
 

1962 births
Living people
Austrian male rowers
Olympic rowers of Austria
Rowers at the 1988 Summer Olympics
Rowers at the 1992 Summer Olympics
Rowers at the 1996 Summer Olympics
Rowers at the 2000 Summer Olympics
Olympic silver medalists for Austria
Olympic medalists in rowing
World Rowing Championships medalists for Austria
Medalists at the 1992 Summer Olympics
20th-century Austrian people